Automate ( means 'acting of one's own will, of oneself') was one of the Danaids in Greek mythology. According to Apollodorus of Athens and others, she killed the (mythical) Egyptian king Busiris, who was betrothed to her. But according to the geographer Pausanias, she was married to Architeles, the son of Achaeus, who emigrated from Phthiotis in Thessaly to Argos with Archander.

Notes

References 

 Apollodorus, The Library with an English Translation by Sir James George Frazer, F.B.A., F.R.S. in 2 Volumes, Cambridge, MA, Harvard University Press; London, William Heinemann Ltd. 1921. ISBN 0-674-99135-4. Online version at the Perseus Digital Library. Greek text available from the same website.
Pausanias, Description of Greece with an English Translation by W.H.S. Jones, Litt.D., and H.A. Ormerod, M.A., in 4 Volumes. Cambridge, MA, Harvard University Press; London, William Heinemann Ltd. 1918. . Online version at the Perseus Digital Library
 Pausanias, Graeciae Descriptio. 3 vols. Leipzig, Teubner. 1903.  Greek text available at the Perseus Digital Library.

Danaids

Princesses in Greek mythology